Euphorbia pellegrinii is a species of plant in the family Euphorbiaceae. It is endemic to Madagascar.  Its natural habitat is subtropical or tropical dry lowland grassland. It is threatened by habitat loss.

The species was first described by Jacques Leandri in 1947, and the specific epithet, pellegrinii, honours François Pellegrin.

References

Endemic flora of Madagascar
pellegrinii
Vulnerable plants
Taxonomy articles created by Polbot
Plants described in 1947
Taxobox binomials not recognized by IUCN